Tulia Ciámpoli (7 January 1915 in Ballesteros, Córdoba – 2 December 1981 in Buenos Aires) was an Argentine actress, dancer, and violinist. In 1928, she became the first Miss Argentina. She was of Italian descent. She was married to David Ovejero and had one daughter, Silvia.

Filmography
 Galería de esperanzas (1934)
 Bajo la santa Federación (1934)
 Internado (1935)
 El cabo Rivero (1938)
 Las de Barranco (1938)
 Cándida (1939)

References

External links

1915 births
1981 deaths
People from Córdoba Province, Argentina
Argentine beauty pageant winners
Argentine film actresses
Argentine stage actresses
Argentine female dancers
Argentine violinists
Argentine people of Italian descent
20th-century Argentine actresses
20th-century violinists